Highline High School is a public high school in Burien, Washington, United States, located about 3.5 miles from Seattle–Tacoma International Airport. Highline High School, the flagship high school of the Highline Public Schools district, opened in 1924 and served the cities of Burien, Des Moines, and an area south of Seattle now known as White Center. Today, those cities all have their own area high schools, but at the time Highline was the only high school in the area.

History
The name Highline, for which the school was named, derives from the original name for Des Moines Memorial Drive, which was called the "High Line Road" for its location along the ridge between Puget Sound and the Miller Creek Valley. Today the name represents the geographic area for Burien, SeaTac, Normandy Park, Des Moines and White Center.

For the 2019–20 and 2020–21 school years, Highline students attended school at the district's Olympic Interim School (615 S 200th St, Des Moines, Washington 98198) while the Highline High School buildings (including the original 1924 structure) were demolished and new buildings were constructed.

Adjacent to the school is the Highline Performing Arts Center, which is used by local community organizations, schools, and dance competition companies.

Sports

Highline participates in the following sports as a member of the KingCo 2A conference: baseball, basketball, cheer, cross country, dance/drill, football, golf, gymnastics, soccer, softball, swimming & diving, tennis, track & field, volleyball, and wrestling.

Highline's sports teams were previously longtime members of the Seamount League and then the South Puget Sound League.

On the 2021-2022 Highline Pirates football team beat Interlake Saints 44-0 making them the 2021 2A King-Co champions. They moved on to playoffs and lost in the 1st round to Squalicum Storms 49-14. They were lead by former Huskies running back Deontae Cooper.

Notable alumni

 Adelle August ('52), actress and Miss Washington USA 1952
 Ingrid Backstrom ('96), freestyle skier
 Ryan Brett ('10), American professional baseball player
 Ray Conner ('73), former vice chairman of Boeing and president and CEO of Boeing Commercial Airplanes
 Nate Daligcon ('92), former professional soccer player
 Mark Driscoll ('89), author and former pastor, Mars Hill Church
 Fred Dyson ('57), former member of the Alaska Senate from Eagle River
 Pete Fewing, soccer coach for Seattle University
 Tyler Geving ('91), assistant coach for the University of Portland Pilots men's basketball team, former head basketball coach at Portland State (2009–17)
 Jack Horsley ('69), swimmer, 1968 Olympic bronze medalist (200 m backstroke)
 Faith Ireland ('60), former Justice, Washington State Supreme Court (1999–2005)
 Jim McCune ('69), member of the Washington House of Representatives and Pierce County Council
 Eric Overmyer ('69), playwright, screenwriter, producer
 John Requa ('85), screenwriter, Cats & Dogs, Bad Santa
 Richard B. Sanders ('63), former Justice, Washington State Supreme Court
 Dan Satterberg ('78), King County Prosecuting Attorney
 Mario Segale ('52), American businessman and real-estate developer
 Mike Starr ('84), bassist for Alice in Chains, Celebrity Rehab with Dr. Drew (Season 3), Sober House (Season 2)
 Ernie Steele ('36), NFL running back
 Shelley Lynn Thornton ('88), known as the "Roe Baby", the child at the center of the Roe v. Wade landmark Supreme Court decision
 Brad Tilden ('79), CEO of Alaska Airlines
Bob Van Duyne ('70), NFL guard, Baltimore Colts (1974–1980)

Notes

References

External links
 
 State of Washington Office of Superintendent of Public Instruction (OSPI) school report card (2016–17)

High schools in King County, Washington
Burien, Washington
Public high schools in Washington (state)
Educational institutions established in 1924
1924 establishments in Washington (state)